David Joseph McCormack (born July 2, 1999) is an American professional basketball player for Beşiktaş Emlakjet of the Basketbol Süper Ligi (BSL). He played college basketball at the University of Kansas where he won the 2022 National Championship.

Early life and high school career
McCormack was born in The Bronx, New York and moved to Virginia at age two. He grew up playing football and basketball, as well as taking part in shot put and discus throw. McCormack played basketball for Norfolk Academy in Norfolk, Virginia before transferring to Oak Hill Academy in Mouth of Wilson, Virginia. He lost about 40 lbs (18 kg) in his first year at Oak Hill. As a senior, he helped his team achieve a 30–4 record and win the 9A state title. McCormack competed alongside Armando Bacot with Team Loaded on the Amateur Athletic Union circuit. He played in the McDonald's All-American Game and Nike Hoop Summit.

Recruiting
A consensus four-star recruit, McCormack committed to playing college basketball for Kansas over offers from Xavier, NC State, Oklahoma State and Duke.

College career
As a freshman at Kansas, McCormack averaged 3.9 points and 3.1 rebounds per game. On December 14, 2019, he recorded a sophomore season-high 28 points and seven rebounds in a 98–57 win over UM Kansas City. As a sophomore, McCormack averaged 6.9 points and 4.1 rebounds per game. He became a regular starter in his junior season with the departure of Udoka Azubuike. On January 12, 2021, McCormack posted 24 points, 12 rebounds and three blocks in a 75–70 loss to Oklahoma State. In the NCAA Tournament, he scored 22 points and posted nine rebounds in a first-round victory over Eastern Washington despite playing through pain. As a junior, McCormack averaged 13.4 points and 6.1 rebounds per game, shooting 51.5 percent from the floor. After the season, he underwent surgery to repair a broken bone in his right foot.

In his senior year, on January 4, 2022, McCormack scored 17 points and achieved a career-high 15 rebounds in KU's defeat of Oklahoma State. On January 22, 2022, he got 15 rebounds against Kansas State, tying his personal best in rebounds. He averaged 10.6 points and 6.98 rebounds per game in his senior year.  McCormack was named to the Third Team All-Big 12 as a senior.  On April 2, 2022, in the 2022 national semifinals against Villanova in New Orleans, McCormack scored 25 points and grabbed 9 rebounds (along with one assist and one steal), leading KU to an 81-65 victory, sending Kansas into the national championship game against North Carolina. In the national championship game against North Carolina on April 4, 2022, McCormack scored 15 points and grabbed 10 rebounds (along with one block and one steal), leading Kansas in the largest comeback in NCAA Tournament history. McCormack was named to the all-tournament team for his play in Kansas' six tourney games, where he averaged 13.1 points a game.

Professional career
On July 28, 2022, McCormack signed with Beşiktaş Icrypex of the Basketbol Süper Ligi.

Career statistics

College

|-
| style="text-align:left;"| 2018–19
| style="text-align:left;"| Kansas
| 34 || 13 || 10.7 || .625 || – || .600 || 3.1 || .4 || .2 || .4 || 3.9
|-
| style="text-align:left;"| 2019–20
| style="text-align:left;"| Kansas
| 29 || 18 || 14.7 || .529 || .000 || .813 || 4.1 || .6 || .4 || .4 || 6.9
|-
| style="text-align:left;"| 2020–21
| style="text-align:left;"| Kansas
| 29 || 28 || 23.1 || .515 || 1.000 || .796 || 6.1 || 1.1 || .7 || 1.0 || 13.4
|-
| style="text-align:left;"| 2021–22
| style="text-align:left;"| Kansas
| 40 || 37 || 21.9 || .508 || .000 || .756 || 7.0 || .9 || .6 || .8 || 10.6
|- class="sortbottom"
| style="text-align:center;" colspan="2"| Career
|| 132 || 96 || 17.7 || .527 || .200 || .760 || 5.2 || .8 || .4 || .5 || 8.7

References

External links
Kansas Jayhawks bio
USA Basketball bio

Living people
American men's basketball players
Basketball players from Norfolk, Virginia
Beşiktaş men's basketball players
Centers (basketball)
Kansas Jayhawks men's basketball players
McDonald's High School All-Americans
Oak Hill Academy (Mouth of Wilson, Virginia) alumni
Sportspeople from the Bronx
Basketball players from New York City
1999 births